Sergio Mannironi (born 17 April 1967) is an Italian weightlifter. He competed in the men's light heavyweight event at the 2000 Summer Olympics.

References

1967 births
Living people
Italian male weightlifters
Olympic weightlifters of Italy
Weightlifters at the 2000 Summer Olympics
Sportspeople from Rome